Charles Byrne may refer to:

Charles Byrne (giant) (1761–1783), also known as "The Irish Giant"
Charles Alfred Byrne (1848–1909), American journalist and playwright
Charles C. Byrne (1837–1921), brigadier general in the United States Army
Charlie Byrne (Australian footballer) (1895–1924), Australian rules footballer
Charlie Byrne (baseball) (1843–1898), original owner of the Brooklyn Dodgers baseball team

See also
Charles Burns (disambiguation)